Raz Degan is an actor, director, and cinematographer, born in a Kibbutz of Sde Nehemia in Israel to Ilan and Adina Degan; he has two brothers who also live and work abroad. At the age of 21, and after three years military service in the Israeli Army, he became a male model and began traveling. He has had exhibitions throughout 2014–2016 in Italy, Israel, and Indonesia.

Career
Degan was initially discovered in New York City as a male model, and subsequently worked in the film industry.  By the mid-1990s, Degan was based in Italy and starred in a series of Italian commercials; he also had roles in several television films and played minor parts in cinematographic films.   In 1994 he had a cameo role in Robert Altman's 1994 film Prêt-à-Porter.  In 2004, he secured the role of Darius III in Oliver Stone's film Alexander. In 2005 Degan played the lead role in Ermanno Olmi's film One Hundred Nails which opened the 2007 Cannes Film Festival. In 2008-2009, he continued to star in various Italian film productions playing different roles including hero and villain. In 2009 he co-starred in Barbarossa, starring Dutch actor Rutger Hauer in the title role. During 2010, Degan played in the French film Forces spéciales alongside Diane Kruger and Djimon Hounsou. After filming was completed, Degan continued travelling in Tajikistan and Afghanistan across the Pamir Mountains range, and then into Tibet and Nepal shooting short documentaries for Italian television. Also in 2010 Degan hosted "Mistero" on  Italia1 for two seasons, making several documentaries.

In 2013, Degan worked as the director of photography for the documentary The Green Prince, which received several awards including the Audience Award for World Cinema – Documentary at the Sundance Film Festival. He was also nominated for several awards for his cinematography. Degan made his directorial debut in 2016 after spending a few years travelling through the Peruvian Amazon working on an international feature documentary called The Last Shaman. The film was executive produced by Leonardo DiCaprio and was released in 2017.

Filmography

Films

Television

References

External links
 
 Interview on Italian television program Verissimo on Canale5

1968 births
Living people
Israeli expatriates in Italy
Israeli male film actors
Israeli male models
Israeli male television actors
Jewish male models